Bende is a  Local Government Area in Abia State, Nigeria with headquarters located in Bende Community.  Bende Local Government Area (L.G.A) of Abia state lies on 70 30I of the Greenwich Meridian and latitude 50 30I North of the Equator. It is composed of thirteen (13) communities, namely: Alayi, Bende, Ezukwu, Igbere, Item, Itumbuzo, Nkpa, Ntalakwu, Ozuitem, Ugwueke, Umu-imenyi, Umuhu-Ezechi, and Uzuakoli.

The population of Bende L.G.A. according to the 2016 population census was 192,621 persons . Bende L.G.A has agriculture climatic conditions typically of the tropics. Bende is bounded in the north by Cross River State, Afikpo and Ohaozara, and in the South by Arochukwu and Ohafia, while in the East and West by Ikwuano L.G.A. and Umuahia L.G.A respectively. Agriculture is widely the occupation of the people and it is a major rice producing area in Abia state.

Localities 

 Agbamuzu
 Agbo-mmiri
 Ama-ogwu
 Amaediaba
 Amaoba
 Amorji-Imenyi
 Amaozara 
 Bende (town) 
 Etiti 
 Iluoma Nzeakoli
 Isiegbu 
 Lodu Imenyi
 Ndi-ekeugo 
 Ndiokorukwu
 Nditoti
 Nkpa
 Obuohia
 Ogo Ubi
 Okporoenyi
 Okputong 
 Onuinyang
 Ovum Ugwu Nkpa
 Ukpom
 Umuokoro,  
 Umuorie,
 Ugwueke

Notable people 
 Arunma Oteh, the former Director-General of Nigeria's Security Exchange Commission. She was also the chair of the Royal African Society in July 2021, appointed to succeed Zeinab Badawi.
 Benjamin Kalu, politician and member of the House of Representatives, representing Bende federal constituency
Orji Uzor Kalu, a Nigerian politician and a two time governor of Abia State, Nigeria.

See also 
 List of villages in Abia State

References

Cities in Abia State
Local Government Areas in Abia State